Following is a list of New American restaurants:

 Alberta Street Pub, Portland, Oregon, U.S.
 Aviary, Portland, Oregon
 Benu, San Francisco, California, U.S.
 Boka, Chicago, Illinois, U.S.
 Boulevard, San Francisco
 Brix Tavern, Portland, Oregon
 Buddakan
 Canlis, Seattle, Washington, U.S.
 The Carlile Room, Seattle
 Coastal Kitchen, Seattle
 Coopers Hall Winery and Taproom, Portland, Oregon
 Copine, Seattle
 Dockside Saloon and Restaurant, Portland, Oregon
 Elements, Princeton, New Jersey, U.S.
 The Four Seasons Restaurant, New York City, New York, U.S.
 Goldfinch Tavern, Seattle
 Gramercy Tavern, New York City
 Harvest Moon Cafe
 Jory Restaurant, Newberg, Oregon
 King's Carriage House
 Kinkead's
 Lark, Seattle
 Laurelhurst Market, Portland, Oregon
 Lost Lake Cafe and Lounge, Seattle
 Mas
 The Misfit, Santa Monica, California
 Oddfellows Cafe and Bar, Seattle
 OK Omens, Portland, Oregon
 One If By Land, Two If By Sea, New York City
 Oriole, Chicago
 Park Grill, Chicago
 Per Se, New York City
 Quaintrelle, Portland, Oregon
 Radar, Portland, Oregon
 Radio Room, Portland, Oregon
 Schwa, Chicago
 Sepia
 Skillet Street Food, Seattle
 SkyCity, Seattle
 Stars, San Francisco
 Swank and Swine, Portland, Oregon
 Tasty n Daughters, Portland, Oregon
 Union Square Cafe, New York City
 wd~50
 White Swan Public House, Seattle
 Wildwood, Portland, Oregon
 Woodberry Kitchen
 Workshop Kitchen + Bar

New American
New American restaurants